In mathematics, rigid cohomology is a p-adic cohomology theory introduced by . It extends crystalline cohomology to schemes that need not be proper or smooth, and extends Monsky–Washnitzer cohomology to non-affine varieties. For a scheme X of finite type over a perfect field k, there are rigid cohomology groups H(X/K) which are finite dimensional vector spaces over the field K of fractions of the ring of Witt vectors of k. More generally one can define rigid cohomology with compact supports, or with support on a closed subscheme, or with coefficients in an overconvergent isocrystal. 
If X is smooth and proper over k the rigid cohomology groups are the same as the crystalline cohomology groups.

The name "rigid cohomology" comes from its relation to rigid analytic spaces. 

 used rigid cohomology to give a new proof of the Weil conjectures.

References

External links

Arithmetic geometry
Cohomology theories